The Men's points race event of the 2016 UCI Track Cycling World Championships was held on 4 March 2016. Jonathan Dibben of Great Britain won the gold medal.

Results
160 laps (40 km) were raced with 16 sprints.

References

Men's points race
UCI Track Cycling World Championships – Men's points race